Shadow over Babylon is a novel by David Mason published in 1993 by Bloomsbury in the UK and by Dutton Adult in the US.

Plot 

The book's plot opens after the Gulf War when a government minister approached a British businessman to execute a plan to assassinate Saddam Hussein. The businessman recruits Sir Peter Dartington, the owner of the international construction company. The latter tasked the mission of preparing and executing the job to Security contractor Ed Howard, an ex-Royal Marines and SBS officer. Howard recruits his men at X.F Security firm, all of them are special forces veterans, including his best friend Mike Ziegler, former officer at the Navy SEALS. In addition, Howard is recruiting a Scottish hunting guide to serve as a sniper of the force. The assassination operation requires the team to deal with Iraqi military on the one hand and successfully evade the US and UK intelligence organizations on the other.

Reception
Reviews were good and didn't pint out critical points. The New York Times called it "absorbing" and "an unusually deft first novel"  Kirkus Reviews stated that readers would "love the details of exactly what happens."

References 

1993 British novels
American thriller novels
E. P. Dutton books
Bloomsbury Publishing books